Smith Heights is the highest part of the jumble of peaks between Kennett Ridge and Junction Spur in the eastern part of the Darwin Mountains. Mapped by the Victoria University of Wellington Antarctic Expedition (VUWAE), 1962–63, and named for G.J. Smith, a member of the expedition.

Mountains of Oates Land